Henry Thrun (born March 12, 2001) is an American college ice hockey defenseman for Harvard University. He was drafted in the fourth round, 101st overall, by the Anaheim Ducks in the 2019 NHL Entry Draft.

Early life
Thrun was born to David and Deborah Thrun and has an older brother, Will. He attended St. Mark's School in Southborough, Massachusetts for his first two years of high school before traveling to Michigan to train with the USA Hockey National Team Development Program (USNTDP) prior to his junior year. He then attended Northville High School, alongside Team USA teammate Matthew Boldy, where he graduated summa cum laude.

The Thrun family have confessed to being fans of New York Rangers which started when father David would frequently attend games from a young age whilst growing up in New Rochelle, New York before moving to Lancaster, New York.

Playing career
Thrun joined the USNTDP for the 2017–18 season and recorded three goals and 17 assists in 32 games for the U-17 team. He returned to the USNTDP for the 2018–19 season and recorded four goals and 19 assists in 28 games.

He began his collegiate career for the Harvard Crimson during the 2019–20 season. He scored his first career on November 1, 2019. During his freshman year he recorded three goals and 18 assists in 31 games, and led the team with a plus-17 rating. Following an outstanding season, he was named a finalist for the ECAC Hockey Best Defensive Defenseman and was named to the All-ECAC Rookie Team. After the Ivy League cancelled their season due to the COVID-19 pandemic, he played for the Dubuque Fighting Saints of the United States Hockey League (USHL) during the 2020–21 season. He recorded eight goals and 14 assists in 24 games for the Fighting Saints. His 0.92 points per game average ranked second among defensemen. Following the season he was named to All-USHL Third Team.

He returned to Harvard during the 2021–22 season. In his junior year he recorded seven goals and 25 assists in 35 games. He led all ECAC Hockey defensemen in per game scoring at 0.91 points per game, and ranked second in defensemen scoring with 27 points. Following an outstanding season he was named a finalist for the ECAC Hockey Best Defensive Defenseman, named to the All-ECAC Second Team and named an AHCA East Second Team All-American.

On February 15, 2023, Thrun, during his final year at Harvard, Thrun notified the Anaheim Ducks that he intended to test free agency rather than sign with them when his rights expired in August 2023. Thrun's rights were subsequently traded to the San Jose Sharks on February 28.

International play

Thrun represented the United States at the 2019 IIHF World U18 Championships where he recorded one assist in seven games and won a bronze medal. He also represented the United States at the 2021 World Junior Ice Hockey Championships where he recorded one assist, and a plus-6 rating in seven games and won a gold medal.

Career statistics

Regular season and playoffs

International

Awards and honours

References

External links
 

2001 births
Living people
AHCA Division I men's ice hockey All-Americans
American ice hockey defensemen
Anaheim Ducks draft picks
Dubuque Fighting Saints players
Harvard Crimson men's ice hockey players
Ice hockey people from Ontario
People from Southborough, Massachusetts
USA Hockey National Team Development Program players